"The Wedding Gig" is a short story by Stephen King first published in Ellery Queen's Mystery Magazine in 1980 and collected in King's 1985 collection Skeleton Crew, as well as in the 1999 mystery story anthology Master's Choice, edited by Lawrence Block.

Plot summary 
Told from the viewpoint of a bandleader during Prohibition, the story centers around a small-time racketeer, Mike Scollay, who hires the narrator's jazz band to play at the wedding of his 300-pound sister, Maureen, and her 90-pound fiancé. At the gig, Scollay's enemy, the Greek, blackmails a man to come to the wedding reception and insult Maureen in front of the guests. Shortly after, Mike is shot down in a hail of gunfire from the Greek's men.

The band leader is approached a short time later in a bar by Maureen, who is despondent and depressed, feeling that she caused her brother's death and is filled with self-loathing over her weight and the way she is aware other people perceiving her. After requesting a song, she leaves, and the narrator never sees her again, but he, like everyone else in the country, follows her story from that point on. Now Maureen Romano, she takes over her brother's racket, with her husband as her lieutenant, and carves out a criminal empire that ironically far eclipses the operations of both her brother and the Greek, whom she soon hunts down and takes a gruesome revenge on. Eventually, she dies of a heart attack and her husband, who does not share her leadership abilities, is later sent to prison. The narrator sadly reflects on the cruel rumors that she had ballooned up even further in weight by that point, something he considers to just be malicious rumors.

See also
 Stephen King short fiction bibliography

External links 
 The story at an archive of HorrorKing.com

Wedding Gig, The
Wedding Gig, The
Works originally published in Ellery Queen's Mystery Magazine